Armenia is Our Home, also known as the Our Home is Armenia Party, is an Armenian political alliance between the Alliance Party and the Union of Armenians of Russia organization.

History 
The Armenia is Our Home Party was first founded in 2004 and led by Vachakan Chibukhchyan. It was then de-registered in 2016 but re-registered in 2018, following the Velvet Revolution. However, Chibukhchyan is no longer associated with the party. Its current leader is Ara Abramyan, the president of the Union of Armenians in Russia.
The party announced that they would participate in the 2021 Armenian parliamentary elections as a political alliance with the Alliance Party. The leader of the Alliance Party, Tigran Urikhanyan, was nominated by the alliance to be the candidate for prime minister.

Following the election, the alliance did not enter the National Assembly, gaining just 0.95% of the popular vote.

Ideology 
The alliance maintains a Pro-Russian stance and calls for greater cooperation between Armenia and Russia. The alliance supports independence for Artsakh, strengthening the economy, and protecting the territorial integrity of Armenia.

Electoral record

See also

 Programs of political parties in Armenia

References

External links 
 Armenia is Our Home on Facebook

Political parties established in 2018
Political party alliances in Armenia
2018 establishments in Armenia